Mineola is an unincorporated community in Lowndes County, in the U.S. state of Georgia.

History
A post office called Mineola was established in 1889 along the route of the newly completed Georgia Southern and Florida Railway, and remained in operation until 1920. "Mineola" is a name derived from an unidentified Native American language meaning "much water".

References

Unincorporated communities in Lowndes County, Georgia